National Liberal Party may refer to:

Active parties 
 National Liberal Party (El Salvador)
 National Liberal Party (Lebanon)
 National Liberal Party (Moldova)
 National Liberal Party (Romania)
 National Liberal Party (UK, 1999)

Defunct parties 

 National Liberal Party (Australia)
 National Liberal Party (Bermuda)
 National Liberal Party (Bulgaria)
 National Liberal Party (Denmark)
 National Liberal Party (Estonia)
 National Liberal Party (Germany), 1867–1918
 National Liberal Party (Hawaii) 
 National Liberal Party (Hungary)
 National Liberal Party (Kingdom of Bohemia), known as Young Czech Party, 1874–1918
 National Liberal Party (Romania, 1875), a dissolved party in Romania
 National Liberal Party-Brătianu, Romania, 1930–1938
 National Liberal Party–Tătărescu, Romania, 1944–1950
 National Liberal Party (UK, 1922), 1922–1923, led by David Lloyd George, merged with UK Liberal Party
 National Liberal Party (UK, 1931), 1931–1968, merged with UK Conservative Party
 National Liberal Party – the Third Way, see Third Way (UK organisation)

See also
 National liberalism
 Liberal Party